The 1919 Bromley by-election was held on 17 December 1919.  The by-election was held due to the elevation to the peerage of the incumbent Coalition Conservative MP, Henry Forster.  It was won by the Coalition Conservative candidate Cuthbert James.

References

Bromley by-election
Bromley by-election
Bromley,1919
Bromley,1919
Bromley,1919
1910s in Kent